Qingdao West railway station is a railway station located in Huangdao District, Qingdao, Shandong, China. It opened with the Qingdao–Yancheng railway on 26 December 2018.

Metro station
The under construction Line 6 of the Qingdao Metro will serve this station.

See also
Qingdao railway station
Qingdao North railway station

References 
 

Railway stations in Shandong
Railway stations in China opened in 2018